Filip Hašek (born 20 March 1997) is a Czech professional footballer who plays as a midfielder for German NOFV-Oberliga Nord club VfB Krieschow.

Club career
Hašek made his professional debut for Bohemians 1905 against Slovácko on 22 July 2018.

References

External links
 Bohemians 1905 official club profile 
 
  

1997 births
Living people
Czech footballers
Czech Republic youth international footballers
Czech Republic under-21 international footballers
Association football midfielders
AC Sparta Prague players
FC Sellier & Bellot Vlašim players
SK Dynamo České Budějovice players
Bohemians 1905 players
MFK Ružomberok players
FK Dukla Prague players
Olympiacos Volos F.C. players
FK Pohronie players
Czech First League players
Slovak Super Liga players
Czech National Football League players
Super League Greece 2 players
Oberliga (football) players
Czech expatriate footballers
Expatriate footballers in Slovakia
Czech expatriate sportspeople in Slovakia
Expatriate footballers in Greece
Czech expatriate sportspeople in Greece
Expatriate footballers in Germany
Czech expatriate sportspeople in Germany